Thomas Pattenson was an English priest in the late late 16th and early 17th centuries.

Pattenson was educated at Trinity College, Cambridge. In 1568 he became a Fellow at Christ's College, Cambridge. He was incorporated at Oxford University in 1577. Pattenson was the archdeacon of Chichester from 1603 until his death in 1607.

References

Fellows of Christ's College, Cambridge
Alumni of Trinity College, Cambridge
Archdeacons of Chichester
17th-century English Anglican priests
16th-century English Anglican priests